Sick and Twisted Affair is the second and final album from Canadian rock band, My Darkest Days. The album was released on March 26, 2012. It debuted at number 29 on the Billboard 200 and number nine on the Billboard Top Rock Albums chart.

Track listing

Personnel
My Darkest Days
 Matt Walst – lead vocals, rhythm guitar 
 Sal Coz Costa – lead guitar, vocals 
 Brendan McMillan – bass guitar 
 Doug Oliver – drums, percussion 
 Reid Henry – keyboard, vocals, rhythm guitar
Additional Personnel
John 5 - guitar on "Casual Sex"
Barry Stock – guitar on "Again"

2012 albums
My Darkest Days albums
604 Records albums
Albums produced by Joey Moi